Pierre-Jacques Cazes (1676 – 25 June 1754) was a French historical painter. He is also known as a teacher of artists, including Chardin.

Cazes took the Prix de Rome for painting in 1699. In 1703, he became part of the Académie, was named as director in 1743 and chancellor in 1746.

Paintings

He worked in the Galerie d'Apollon in the Louvre in 1727 and produced a large number of religious paintings for churches in Paris and Versailles.

His historical painting is in the same academic tradition as the French painters Charles Le Brun and Charles de Lafosse. He also painted paintings with mythological motifs and genre scenes.

A portrait the artist wearing a wig and holding a portfolio was presented to the Académie Royale in 1734 by Chardin's friend Joseph Aved.

External links

17th-century French painters
French male painters
18th-century French painters
Prix de Rome for painting
1676 births
1754 deaths
18th-century French male artists